Usagi may refer to:
Usagi, a Japanese term meaning rabbit
Typhoon Usagi (disambiguation), one of several named tropical storms
Usagi, a Japanese unisex name/unisex given name, used by
Usagi Tsukino or Sailor Moon, the main character in Sailor Moon
Usagi "Chibiusa" Tsukino or Chibiusa, a character in Sailor Moon
Miyamoto Usagi, the main character in Usagi Yojimbo 
Kuro Usagi, also called Black Rabbit, one of the main characters from "Mondaiji tachi ga isekai kara kuru sou desu yo?" (Problem Children Are Coming from Another World, Aren't They?) or short "Mondaiji tachi" series
Usagi, a Japanese warabe uta
Name of several manga/comic series, including
Hana Usagi, a manga series by Kentarō Kobayashi
Samurai Usagi, a manga series by Teppei Fukushima
Usagi Drop or Bunny Drop, a manga series by Yumi Unita
Usagi Yojimbo, a comic book series by Stan Sakai